Lee Byeong-gu (born 20 June 1942) is a South Korean basketball player. He competed in the men's tournament at the 1964 Summer Olympics and the 1968 Summer Olympics.

References

External links
 

1942 births
Living people
South Korean men's basketball players
1970 FIBA World Championship players
Olympic basketball players of South Korea
Basketball players at the 1964 Summer Olympics
Basketball players at the 1968 Summer Olympics
Basketball players from Seoul
Asian Games medalists in basketball
Asian Games bronze medalists for South Korea
Basketball players at the 1966 Asian Games
Medalists at the 1966 Asian Games